Lenzari is a small village in the municipality of Vessalico, located in the Province of Imperia in the Italian region of Liguria.

Geography of Liguria